Kvarnby is a neighbourhood of Malmö, situated in the Borough of Husie, Malmö Municipality, Skåne County, Sweden.

Sports
The following sports clubs are located in Kvarnby:
 Kvarnby IK
 Kvarnby Golfklubb

References

Neighbourhoods of Malmö